= Rome Newswire =

Online newspaper in Georgia, United States

- Type: Daily online newspaper, monthly print edition
- Owner(s): W.A.(Bill) Smith Jr.- 7 Hills Media LLC.
- Editor: Dawn Treglown
- Staff writers: Hayden Jennings, Dan Bobo
- Founded: 2006
- Headquarters: Rome, Georgia, United States
- Website: Rome Newswire

Rome Newswire was a local online daily newspaper of Rome, Georgia, United States. It is owned by Seven Hills Media, LLC. It was established as a daily news blog by local radio personality Jerry Duke and quickly grew to become one of the leading news sites in the Northwest Georgia region.

It was sold to Seven Hills Media, LLC. in 2009. The site received approximately 4.3 million page views from over 1.2 million visitors annually. Rome Newswire also published a monthly print edition called "The Newswire" highlighting local citizens and businesses.

As of 2012, the media outlet had gone inactive.
